Şevket is a Turkish male name with the Arabic equivalent Shawkat. People named Şevket include:

Şevket Tartar, Turkish salesman
 Şevket Süreyya Aydemir (1897–1976), Turkish intellectual
 Şevket Müftügil (1917–2015), Turkish judge
 Şevket Pamuk, Turkish economist
 Şevket Sabancı (1936–2021), Turkish businessman
 Şevket Şahintaş, Turkish photographer

Turkish masculine given names